In algebraic geometry, an exotic affine space is a complex algebraic variety that is diffeomorphic to  for some n, but is not isomorphic as an algebraic variety to .  An example of an exotic  is the Koras–Russell cubic threefold, which is the subset of  defined by the polynomial equation

References

Algebraic varieties
Diffeomorphisms